The following is the 1957–58 network television schedule for the four major English language commercial broadcast networks in the United States. The schedule covers primetime hours from September 1957 through March 1958. The schedule is followed by a list per network of returning series, new series, and series cancelled after the 1956–57 season.

As in previous seasons, both CBS and ABC continued to add Westerns to their schedule, filling prime time with as many "oaters" (as they were derisively called) as possible. In addition to several returning Westerns which the network retained on its fall 1957 schedule, ABC's new western series included Sugarfoot and Broken Arrow on Tuesday nights, Tombstone Territory on Wednesdays, Colt .45 on Fridays, and Maverick on Sundays.

ABC, third in the network Nielsen ratings, placed its new Western Maverick in a difficult time slot: Sunday night against two hit series: The Steve Allen Show on NBC, and The Ed Sullivan Show on CBS. ABC aired Maverick one half-hour prior to the Allen and Sullivan programs; the strategy was designed to "hook the audience before it fell into its usual viewing habits".

NBC, late to the Western format, also began plugging Westerns into its fall schedule. New NBC Western series debuting in the 1957–58 season included Wagon Train, The Restless Gun, and The Californians (though one NBC executive insisted The Californians is not a Western but a drama set in California in the 1850s).

Another programming shift occurred at NBC: the network's flagship news program, The Huntley-Brinkley Report, moved to the 7:15 PM weekday timeslot, for the first time going head to head against both ABC's and CBS's news programs. The face-off between the three networks' news programs would become the standard model for U.S. broadcast television; the three networks still air their network news programs against one another.

1958 saw a number of executive changes at the networks; these presidential shifts would affect the network television schedules. Oliver Treyz became the president of ABC on February 17, Louis G. Cowan became the president of CBS on March 12, and NBC programmer Robert Kintner became the president of NBC on July 11. Dr. Allen B. DuMont resigned as chairman of the board of the DuMont Broadcasting Corporation on May 13, and the name of the company was changed to Metropolitan Broadcasting Corporation. According to Castleman and Podrazik (1982) the final DuMont Network program, Monday Night Fights aired for the last time on August 4, 1958, carried on only five stations nationwide. NBC's Kraft Television Theatre, which had debuted in 1947 and was the oldest program still left on television, was cancelled in spring 1958. It was the dawn of a new era in television; producer David Susskind, who had produced KTT at the end, would call 1958 "the year of the miserable drivel".

New fall series are highlighted in bold. Series ending are highlighted in italics

Each of the 30 highest-rated shows is listed with its rank and rating as determined by Nielsen Media Research.

 Yellow indicates the programs in the top 10 for the season.
 Cyan indicates the programs in the top 20 for the season.
 Magenta indicates the programs in the top 30 for the season.

Sunday 

Note: On CBS, Air Power, narrated by Walter Cronkite, aired from 6:30 to 7:00 p.m. from May 4 to October 19, 1958. It consisted entirely of reruns of the series from the 1956–1957 season.

Monday 

In some areas, Douglas Edwards with the News and The Huntley-Brinkley Report aired at 6:45 p.m.

Tuesday 

Confession, with host Jack Wyatt, began as a local program in the Dallas, Texas, market in early 1957. It premiered as a summer replacement on ABC on June 19, 1958, in advance of the 1958–59 television season.

Wednesday

Thursday 

From January 2 to June 26, 1958, Richard Diamond, Private Detective, starring David Janssen, aired for a second season on the CBS Thursday schedule at 8 p.m. Eastern. It returned to the air for a third season from February to September 1959.

Friday 

Saber of London, with Donald Gray in the lead role, entered its seventh season with a new name, its fourth, and a new network, NBC. It had run on ABC from 1951 to 1954 and 1955 to 1957 under three previous titles: Mystery Theater, Inspector Mark Saber—Homicide Detective, and The Vise. Saber of London was later replaced in the 7:30 Friday time slot on NBC on April 25, 1958, by the western series, Jefferson Drum, starring Jeff Richards.

Saturday 

Notes: On NBC, Club Oasis, which had a different host for each episode, became Club Oasis with Spike Jones during the summer of 1958 when Spike Jones became the permanent host. Opening Night consisted of reruns of episodes of the ABC series Ford Theatre from the 1956–1957 season. The Polly Bergen Show and Club Oasis alternated in the time slot, each show airing every other week. During the summer of 1958, Opening Night and Club Oasis with Spike Jones alternated in the time slot, each show airing every other week. Turning Point was a dramatic anthology series consisting of two unsold pilots and reruns of episodes from other series.  The Joseph Cotten Show consisted of reruns of the 1956–1957 series On Trial.

By network

ABC

Returning Series
The Adventures of Jim Bowie
The Adventures of Ozzie and Harriet
The Adventures of Rin Tin Tin
Bachelor Father
The Billy Graham Crusade
Bold Journey
Broken Arrow
Cheyenne
Circus Boy (Moved from NBC)
Confession
Country Music Jubilee
Date with the Angels
Disneyland
Famous Fights
John Daly and the News
Jubilee USA
Lawrence Welk's Dodge Dancing Party
Lawrence Welk's Top Tunes and New Talent
The Life and Legend of Wyatt Earp
Make Me Laugh
Midwestern Hayride
Navy Log
Open Hearing
Telephone Time
The Voice of Firestone
The Wednesday Night Fights
The West Point Story (moved from CBS)
You Asked For It
Zorro

New Series
All-American Football Game of the Week
American Odyssey *
The Andy Williams Show
Anybody Can Play/Anyone Can Play
The Betty White Show
Bowling Stars (moved from NBC as National Bowling Championships)
Campaign Roundup *
Colt .45
Confession
Cowtown Rodeo *
The Dick Clark Show *
The Frank Sinatra Show *
The Guy Mitchell Show
Harbourmaster
Keep It in the Family
Lawrence Welk's Plymouth Show
Love That Jill *
Make Me Laugh *
Maverick
The Mike Wallace Interview
O.S.S.
The Pat Boone Chevy Showroom
The Patrice Munsel Show
Polka Go-Round *
Scotland Yard
Sugarfoot
This is Music *
Tombstone Territory
The Walter Winchell File

Not returning from 1956–57:
Air Time '57
The Big Beat
The Billy Graham Crusade
Circus Time
Compass
Conflict
Crossroads
Deadline for Action
Focus
Industries for America
It's Polka Time
Kukla, Fran and Ollie
Life Is Worth Living
The Lone Ranger
Masquerade Party
Omnibus
Press Conference
The Ray Anthony Show
Treasure Hunt
The Vise (Moved to NBC and retitled Saber of London)

CBS

Returning Series
The $64,000 Challenge
The $64,000 Question
The Adventures of Robin Hood
Alfred Hitchcock Presents
Armstrong Circle Theatre
Arthur Godfrey's Talent Scouts
Climax!
The Danny Thomas Show
December Bride
Douglas Edwards and the News
The Ed Sullivan Show
The Gale Storm Show
General Electric Theatre
The George Burns and Gracie Allen Show
Gunsmoke
I Love Lucy
I've Got a Secret
The Jack Benny Show
Lassie
Masquerade Party
The Millionaire
Mr. Adams and Eve
Person to Person
The Phil Silvers Show
Playhouse 90
The Red Skelton Show
Richard Diamond, Private Detective
Schlitz Playhouse
Sergeant Preston of the Yukon
Shower of Stars
The Spike Jones Show
Studio One in Hollywood
To Tell the Truth
The United States Steel Hour
What's My Line
Zane Grey Theatre

New Series
Assignment: Foreign Legion *
Bachelor Father
Bid 'n' Buy *
The Big Record
The Boing Boing Show
Climax!
Dick and the Duchess
DuPont Show of the Month
The Eve Arden Show
Frontier Justice *
Have Gun — Will Travel
High Adventure
Leave It to Beaver
Perry Mason
Shower of Stars
Top Dollar *
Trackdown
The Twentieth Century

Not returning from 1956–57:
The 20th Century Fox Hour
The Bob Cummings Show (moved to NBC)
The Brothers
Dr. Christian
The Garry Moore Show
Giant Step
The Herb Shriner Show
Hey, Jeannie! (Moved to first-run syndication)
High Finance
My Friend Flicka
Pick the Winner
Private Secretary
The Vincent Lopez Show
You're On Your Own

Dumont
Not returning from 1956–57:
Ethel Barrymore Theatre

NBC

Returning Series
The Alfred Hitchcock Hour
American Profile
The Art Linkletter Show
Bachelor Father
The Bell Telephone Hour
The Bob Cummings Show (moved from CBS)
Chet Huntley Reporting
Circus Boy
Colgate Theatre
The Dinah Shore Chevy Show
Dragnet
Father Knows Best
The Ford Show
The George Gobel Show
Gillette Cavalcade of Sports
Goodyear Theatre
The Huntley–Brinkley Report
It's a Great Life
The Jack Benny Program
Kraft Television Theatre
The Lux Show Starring Rosemary Clooney
The Life of Riley
Meet McGraw
The Nat King Cole Show
Noah's Ark
Omnibus (moved from ABC)
The Original Amateur Hour
People Are Funny
The People's Choice
The Perry Como Show
Red Barber's Corner
Richard Diamond, Private Detective
Saber of London (Moved from ABC, formerly known as The Vise)
The Steve Allen Show
Tales of Wells Fargo
This Is Your Life
Twenty-One
Wide Wide World
You Bet Your Life
Your Hit Parade

New Series
The Big Game *
The Bob Crosby Show *
The Californians
Club Oasis with Spike Jones *
The Court of Last Resort
Decision *
Dotto
Dragnet
The Eddie Fisher Show
The Gisele MacKenzie Show
The Investigator *
It Could Be You *
The Jane Wyman Show
Jefferson Drum *
The Lux Show Starring Rosemary Clooney
M Squad
Music Bingo *
No Warning!
The Price Is Right
The Steve Lawrence and Eydie Gormé Show
The Subject is Jazz *
Suspicion
The Thin Man
This is Music *
Tic-Tac-Dough
Turn of Fate (Alcoa Theatre)
Wagon Train
What's It For?

Not returning from 1956–57:
The Adventures of Hiram Holiday
The Andy Williams and June Valli Show
The Big Moment
The Big Story
Blondie
Break the $250,000 Bank
Caesar's Hour
Circus Boy (Moved to ABC)
Dollar a Second
The Jonathan Winters Show
The Joseph Cotten Show
The Julius LaRosa Show
The Kaiser Aluminum Hour
National Bowling Championships (moved to ABC as Bowling Stars)
Panic!
Producer's Showcase
Robert Montgomery Presents
Saturday Color Carnival
Stanley
Tales of the 77th Bengal Lancers
The Web
Wire Service

NTA

New series
How to Marry a Millionaire
Man Without a Gun
Premiere Performance

Note: The * indicates that the program was introduced in midseason.

References

Further reading 
 McNeil, Alex. Total Television. Fourth edition. New York: Penguin Books. .
 Brooks, Tim & Marsh, Earle (1964). The Complete Directory to Prime Time Network TV Shows (3rd ed.). New York: Ballantine. .

United States primetime network television schedules
United States network television schedule
United States network television schedule